Air Force Station Salua is an Indian Air Force Station located in Kharagpur, located in the Paschim Medinipur district of West Bengal. It lies on the State Highway 5 at a distance of 7 km from IIT Kharagpur.

History
It is a World War II air base, which was used by the 317th Airlift Squadron of the US Air Force, and was the first base of operations for the B-29 Superfortresses (units of the 58th Bomb Wing). The airstrip fell out of use after World War II but it is currently has a RADAR station. The nearest Airstrip is at Air Force Station Kalaikunda.

Current status
Currently it is used as a radar station by the Indian Air Force.

References

Indian Air Force bases
Kharagpur
Airports in West Bengal